So Glad may refer to:

 "So Glad", a song by KC and the Sunshine Band from the album Who Do Ya (Love), 1978
 "So Glad", a song by Michelle Williams from the album Heart to Yours, 2002